Te Voy a Enseñar a Querer (English title: Learning to Love), is a Spanish-language telenovela produced by the United States-based television network Telemundo and RTI Colombia. This limited-run series ran for 129 episodes from August 31, 2004 to March 14, 2005.

Plot
Alejandro Méndez is a successful man, married to Isabel, and has two grown children, Pablo and Helena. He loves his breeding ranch that specializes in providing animals for bull fights. Between the ranch and a real estate business, the family enjoys an affluent standard of living.

Alejandro's life changes when Isabel dies suddenly under dubious circumstances. Alejandro falls into a depression and abandons all interest in life, his ranch and the people he loves.

Diana is a veterinarian who meets Pablo at a nightclub and turns him down due to his rich-boy attitude. Pablo is obsessed with her end and when Diana is hired to work on the ranch, tries to seduce her.

Milciades, a landowner envious of the ranch, joins forces with Déborah in a conspiracy attempt. She is treacherous woman who married Isabel's father out of sheer interest and will try to eliminate her from the picture to conquer Alejandro and obtain his fortune.

The ranch is in midst of a crisis and Diana defends it. She seeks Alejandro to pull out of his depression because his family needs him. Diana convinces him to return, to fight for the only true thing that will bring his life back.

One day, Diana discovers that Alejandro is also in love with her and at the same time, Pablo finds out his father has stolen her. Pablo threatens to take his own life and manipulates the situation to get Diana's attention. She feels imprisoned by the turn of events and Alejandro feels terribly guilty, so he falls back to avoid hurting his son. Milciades and Déborah set a trap that will lead to conflict between Diana and Alejandro. Pablo realizes that his father is Diana's one true love and convinces him to fight to reconquer her heart.

Cast
 Miguel Varoni as Alejandro Méndez
 Danna García as Diana Rivera
 Catherine Siachoque as Déborah Buenrostro
 Dilsa García as Young Déborah
 Michel Brown as Pablo Méndez
 Jorge Cao as Milciades Contreras
 Martín Karpan as Luís Carlos Carmona
 Melvin Cabrera as Salvador Cascante
 Carolina Lizarazo as Flor del Valle
 Ana Lucía Domínguez as Camila Buenrostro
 Sharmel Altamirano as Elena Méndez
 Consuelo Luzardo as Rufina Rivera
 Carlos Duplat as Félix Gallardo
 Silvio Ángel as Pedro Rivera
 María Helena Döehring as Isabel de Méndez / Orquídeas Fernández
 Julio del Mar as Tobías Cascante
 Natalia Giraldo as Tulia Ángeles Vivas
 Silvia de Dios as Empera Ángeles Vivas
 Juan Pablo Shuk as Juan Manuel Andrade
 Toto Vega as Cachimbo
 Julián Álvarez as Aycardo
 Ricardo González as Pueblita Rozar
 Didier van der Hove as Dr. Rodrigo Rodríguez
 Alexander Rodríguez as Dionisio
 Irene Arias as Justina
 Iván Rodríguez as Sacrificios Díaz de León
 Luz Estella Luengas as Clementina Ángeles Vivas
 Adriana Campos as Margarita Ángeles
 Cristina Pimiento as Estefanía Ángeles
 Germán Rojas as Vicente
 Oscar Vargas as Beto
 Alejandro Mendoza as Daniel Pérez
 Luz Mary Arias as Mónica
 José Bautista as Inspector Cataño #1
 Jaime Rayo as  Inspector Cataño #2
 Sigifredo Vega as Don Olegario
 Margarita Duran as Raquel Buenrostro
 Juan Rafael Restrepo as Juan Rafael
 Santiago Alarcón as  Bernardo Ángeles
 German Arias as Dr. Banderas
 Alfonso Rojas as Chucho Mejia
 Carlos Vergara as Jacinto Mejia
 Vilma Vera as Doña Pepa
 Martha Isabel Bolaños as Charó Bedoya
 Helga Díaz as Nachely Carmona
 Ricardo Andrés Herrera as Emilio Contreras
 Naren Daryanani as Hugo
 Manuel Busquets as Lorenzo
 Carlos Hurtado as Moncho

References

External links 
 

2004 telenovelas
2004 American television series debuts
2005 American television series endings
2004 Colombian television series debuts
2005 Colombian television series endings
Colombian telenovelas
RTI Producciones telenovelas
Caracol Televisión telenovelas
Telemundo telenovelas
Spanish-language American telenovelas
Television shows set in Bogotá